Barakat Oyinlomo Quadre (born 1 May 2003) is a Nigerian tennis player. She is currently the highest ranked Nigerian in the WTA women's single category.  she was ranked number one in Nigeria, 9th in Africa and 945 in the world in the women's singles category.

Quadre has represented Nigeria at the Billie Jean King Cup, making her debut in 2021.

Career 
Quadre began playing tennis at age 4. As a junior player, she was ranked 173 on 17 June 2019. At the 2015 ITF/CAT Junior Championship in Morocco, Quadre established herself as one of Africa's best junior tennis players, and secured a scholarship to High Performance Center in Morocco. At the 2016 ITF U-18 Championship, Quadre made the quarter-finals. In 2017, defeated Chakira Dermane of Togo 6-0, 6-0 to set a quarter final clash with Sophia Biolay from France. At national level, she was chosen to represent Nigeria at the 2016 Africa Junior Tennis Championship. She won the ITF/CAT U-16 Championship in Togo.

At the 2018 Lagos Open, Quadre defeated Airhunmwunde, 6-1, 6-0 to qualify for the second round. In her next game, she lost to Anna Sisková and crashed out of the tournament.

ITF Finals

Doubles

ITF junior finals

Singles (9–1)

Doubles (6–6)

References

External links

 
 
 
 

2003 births
Living people
Nigerian female tennis players
Competitors at the 2019 African Games
African Games medalists in tennis
African Games bronze medalists for Nigeria
21st-century Nigerian women